Tom Howe may refer to:

 Tom Howe (soccer) (born 1949), American soccer midfielder
 Tom Howe (rugby union) (born 1995), English rugby union player
 Tom Howe (musician) (born 1977), British-born musician